The 2013 Big East men's basketball tournament, officially known as the 2013 Big East Championship, was the 34th annual Big East men's basketball tournament, deciding the champion of the 2012–13 Big East Conference men's basketball season. For the 31st consecutive season, the tournament was held at Madison Square Garden in New York City, from March 12–16, 2013. The tournament only featured 14 teams due to Connecticut being given a one-year postseason ban due to APR penalties.  This would have been the last year with as many as 16 teams participating in the Big East tournament, but Connecticut was ineligible and West Virginia moved to the Big 12 before the beginning of the season. The conference tournament champion received an automatic bid to the 2013 NCAA tournament.

Following a period of turnover in the conference membership, the Big East name, its logos, and its tournament history were assumed by schools of the original Big East that do not sponsor FBS football. The reconfigured Big East continues to hold its tournament at Madison Square Garden. The FBS schools formerly in the Big East play under a new name, the American Athletic Conference; its first conference tournament was played in Memphis, Tennessee and that event has since alternated between Hartford, Connecticut and Orlando, Florida.

Seeds
All teams except for Connecticut (due to Academic Progress Rate violations) qualified for the tournament; seeds 11-14 played a first round game, while teams five through ten received byes to the second round. The top four seeds received double-byes to the quarterfinals.

Teams were seeded by conference record, with a tiebreaker system used to seed teams with identical conference records.

Schedule
All tournament games were nationally televised on an ESPN network:

Bracket

OT denotes overtime game

All-Tournament team

Russ Smith, Louisville
James Southerland, Syracuse
Brandon Triche, Syracuse
Markel Starks, Georgetown
Pat Connaughton, Notre Dame

Dave Gavitt Trophy (Most Outstanding Player)
Peyton Siva, Louisville

References 

Tournament
Big East men's basketball tournament
Basketball competitions in New York City
College sports tournaments in New York City
Sports in Manhattan
Big East men's basketball tournament
Big East men's basketball tournament
2010s in Manhattan